Frank Pingel Mortensen (born 9 May 1964) is a Danish former professional footballer and manager, who played as a forward.

Club career
Pingel most notably represented Danish teams AGF and Brøndby, as well as foreign clubs Newcastle United, 1860 Munich, Bursaspor, Fenerbahçe and Lille. While playing for Brøndby IF between 1989 and 1991, as well as the 1992–93 season, he managed to score a total of 30 goals in 93 games, with 22 of these being scored in the Danish league.

International career
Pingel made 11 appearances and scored five goals for the Denmark national team.

Managerial career
In 2000, Pingel briefly coached FC Aarhus just for a few months, being fired after a skirmish with Norwegian player Stig Haaland. Afterwards he coached Danish eighth division club Hørning IF, before returning to his former club AGF as a team masseur. Pingel was sacked from his position on 17 March 2008 after being involved in a quarrel at AGF's training camp in Cyprus.

Honours

Player
Brøndby
Danish Football Championship1''': 1990, 1991

 1: Level 1: 1. Division (1945–1990), Superligaen (1991–present)

References

External links
 Danish national team profile 
 Official Danish Superliga profile (only from 1991 and forward) 
 
 
 Historiske resultater for alle spillere i Brøndby IF 

1964 births
Living people
Footballers from Aarhus
Danish men's footballers
Denmark international footballers
Fuglebakken KFUM players
Aarhus Gymnastikforening players
Newcastle United F.C. players
Brøndby IF players
TSV 1860 Munich players
Bursaspor footballers
Fenerbahçe S.K. footballers
Lille OSC players
Danish Superliga players
English Football League players
Danish expatriate men's footballers
Süper Lig players
Ligue 1 players
2. Bundesliga players
Expatriate footballers in England
Danish expatriate sportspeople in England
Expatriate footballers in Germany
Danish expatriate sportspeople in Germany
Danish expatriate sportspeople in Turkey
Expatriate footballers in Turkey
Expatriate footballers in France
Danish expatriate sportspeople in France
Danish football managers
Aarhus Fremad managers
Association football forwards
VSK Aarhus players